Moulaye Idrissa Ba, known as Idrissa Ba (born 11 November 1990) is a French professional footballer who plays as a forward for  club Villefranche.

Club career
On 25 August 2021, Ba joined Bastia-Borgo.

On 20 June 2022, Ba signed with Villefranche.

Personal life
Born in France, Ba is of Senegalese and Mauritanian descent.

Notes

References

Living people
1990 births
People from Échirolles
Association football forwards
French footballers
French sportspeople of Mauritanian descent
French sportspeople of Senegalese descent
Ligue 2 players
Championnat National players
ÉFC Fréjus Saint-Raphaël players
Football Bourg-en-Bresse Péronnas 01 players
Les Herbiers VF players
USL Dunkerque players
Pau FC players
FC Bastia-Borgo players
FC Villefranche Beaujolais players
Sportspeople from Isère
Footballers from Auvergne-Rhône-Alpes